The Victory Party  is a Sufi political party in Egypt.

References

Islamic political parties in Egypt
Political parties with year of establishment missing
Political parties in Egypt
Sufism